Robert John Hayfron-Benjamin was a Ghanaian lawyer and judge. He was the Chief Justice of Botswana and an Appeal Court judge in Ghana. He was also the chairman of the Ghana Law Reform Commission and the deputy speaker of the Consultative Assembly that was established to help draft and interpret the 1992 constitution. He attended Adisadel College.

Biography
Hayfron-Benjamin was born in April 1929 in Ghana (then Gold Coast).

He studied at the University of London for his Bachelor of Laws degree and proceeded to the Middle Temple, London to study law. He was called to the bar in 1955.

Hayfron-Benjamin begun as a private legal practitioner in Ghana from 1955 to 1963 when he was appointed Principal State Attorney. On 24 June 1964, he was called to the bench of the High Court of Ghana and in 1966, he doubled as a Solicitor General. He served as a High Court judge from 1964 until 1976 when he was elevated to Appeal Court bench.

In 1977, Hayfron-Benjamin was appointed Chief Justice of Botswana. He served in that capacity until 1981. After his judicial service in Botswana, he returned to Ghana and resumed in his previous post as Justice of the Court of Appeal. He served in this capacity until his retirement from judicial service in 1997. In 1991, he was elected deputy speaker of the Consultative Assembly, an assembly that was established to help draft and interpret the 1992 constitution.

He died in 2000, aged 71.

Awards
 Member of the Order of the Volta. (1977)

See also
 Chief Justice of Botswana

References

1929 births
2000 deaths
20th-century Ghanaian judges
Botswana judges
Alumni of the University of London